Carlos Fonseca Amador (23 June 1936 – 8 November 1976) was a Nicaraguan teacher, librarian and revolutionary who founded the Sandinista National Liberation Front (FSLN). Fonseca was later killed in the mountains of the Zelaya Department, Nicaragua, three years before the FSLN took power.

Early years
Fonseca was born in a "corner house" his aunt (Isaura) acquired at the south-end of Matagalpa. His mother lived in a back room. Fonseca was the son of Augustina Fonseca Úbeda, an unmarried rural woman. His father, Fausto Amador Alemán, a member of a coffee-growing family, did not acknowledge Fonseca until his elementary school years. Fonseca's father was part of a wealthy family, while his mother was a peasant. Although his father later helped him go to school and educate himself, Fonseca held greater admiration for his mother because of her work ethic and strength. Because of this, Fonseca inverted the usual naming convention in Latin America and used her surname first, and was consequently known as Carlos Fonseca Amador.

In 1950, Fonseca entered secondary school and slowly became involved with political groups. In the early 1950s, he attended meetings for a Conservative Party youth group and joined the Unión Nacional de Acción Popular (UNAP, National Union of Popular Action). Fonseca became increasingly interested in Marxism and joined the Partido Socialista Nicaragüense (PSN, Nicaraguan Socialist Party). He left the UNAP in 1953 or 1954, complaining they were too "bourgeoisified" on social issues, and not active enough against the Somoza government. In 1954, he and several school friends founded and began to publish a cultural journal called Segovia.

Early political activity
In 1957, Fonseca traveled to the Soviet Union as a PSN delegate to the 6th World Festival of Youth and Students organized by the World Federation of Democratic Youth. Fonseca later wrote a book chronicling his visit to the USSR entitled Un Nicaragüense en Moscú ("A Nicaraguan in Moscow"). The book featured uncritical praise of the accomplishments of the Soviet government, including its "free press, complete freedom of religion and the efficiency of its worker-run industries."

Taking up arms
Fidel Castro and the 26th of July Movement took power in Cuba on January 1, 1959. The Cuban Revolution was a major event all over Latin America and sparked both great concern and a sense of possibility in Nicaragua. The Cuban Revolution was a central event in Fonseca's political evolution as it convinced him that a revolution was possible and that organisation was necessary. Just as the Cuban revolution was organized outside the framework of the Cuban Communist Party, he came to believe that a Nicaraguan revolutionary movement could be created outside of the PSN and other pre-existing groups.   

The rebel victory in Cuba was mirrored by an increase in armed anti-Somoza actions in Nicaragua. Fonseca took part in one such uprising in 1959. In February of that year, Fonseca, as well as many other more prominent Nicaraguan radicals, traveled to Cuba.  

In mid-1959, Fonseca joined a Nicaraguan guerrilla brigade which had a training camp in southern Honduras. On June 24, 1959, the brigade was ambushed by Honduran and Nicaraguan troops in Honduras, ending in the death of several rebels and the wounding and capturing of many others, including Fonseca. The incident marked the end of Fonseca's relationship with the PSN. Whereas Fonseca's revolutionary zeal increased in the aftermath of the ambush, the PSN became convinced that a revolution in Nicaragua was impossible. Labelling Fonseca and other Nicaraguans who fought in the brigade as too "guerrilla-ist," the PSN expelled Fonseca and the others.   

Fonseca managed to leave the military hospital in Honduras where he was taken after the June 24th ambush and went to Cuba. There, he began to seriously study Augusto César Sandino. Fonseca also began to host political meetings in a small apartment in the Miramar section of Havana. The meetings were frequented by people who would later become part of the FSLN.

Sandinista
Between 1959 and 1963, Fonseca and those who would become the earliest members of the FSLN began to organise in the hopes of forming a true revolutionary organization.  Having formed several short-lived groups, the FSLN came to be in 1963. Originally, Fonseca hoped to duplicate the Cuban revolution in Nicaragua, drawing up battle plans based on the Cuban experience. 

In mid-1963, a guerrilla cadre entered the Rios Coco y Bocay area of Nicaragua. Poorly prepared and having done little advance work in the area, several guerrillas were killed by the Guardia Nacional, while others were able to escape across the Honduran border.

In June 1964, Fonseca and Víctor Tirado were arrested in Managua. The two (along with four others) were accused of plotting to assassinate Anastasio Somoza Debayle. Rather than present a defense during his trial, Fonseca leveled charges against Somoza which were later detailed in his manuscript, From Prison, I Accuse the Dictatorship.

Between 1964 and 1966, the FSLN carried out educational work and community organizing, creating indoctrination classes and campaigning to bring resources to working-class neighborhoods in Managua. While Fonseca continued to hold the top leadership position in the FSLN, he was out of the country for much of the mid-1960s, having fled to Mexico and then Costa Rica. 

By mid-1966, plans for a second FSLN guerrilla operation in the Pancasan region (near Matagalpa) were underway. The operation began in May 1967 with about forty guerrillas. This time, the guerrillas were better trained and armed and had women among their ranks. Fonseca, along with a few other FSLN leaders were committed to the inclusion of women, but some of the other fighters were not comfortable fighting alongside women. Like the earlier guerrilla incursion, the Pancasan operation ended with many of the FSLN guerrillas being killed by the Guardia Nacional. However, Fonseca, and the others who survived, considered the operation a political victory "because it showed the whole country that the FSLN still existed".. The presence of the FSLN in the mountains led to a steady persecution of their leaders by the National Guard which forced Fonseca to make use of unusual tactics by hiding in the homes of people not associated with the FSLN, most notably his stay, for a week in Novembre of  1967 at the Managua home of Dame  Angelica Balladares de Arguello , who had been the former President of the Femenist League, ¨Woman of the Américas¨ in 1959,  and since 1926, known as  "The First Lady of Nicaraguan Liberalism".

Mitrokhin book 
In his book The World Was Going Our Way, Vasily Mitrokhin relates how, as part of the KGB's  Aleksandr Shelepin's strategy of using national liberation movements to advance the Soviet Union's foreign policy in the Third World, Shelepin organized funding and training in Moscow for twelve individuals handpicked by Fonseca, and the twelve were the core of the new Sandinista organization. However, Russia historian J. Arch Getty, writing in the American Historical Review, raised questions about the trustworthiness and verifiability of Mitrokhin's material about the Soviet Union, doubting whether this "self-described loner with increasingly anti-Soviet views" would have had the opportunity to "transcribe thousands of documents, smuggle them out of KGB premises", etc. Former Indian counter-terrorism chief Bahukutumbi Raman also questions both the validity of the material and the conclusions drawn from them.

Popular culture

In the mid 1980s, musician Paul Kantner traveled to Nicaragua out of concern for the Sandinista situation. While in the country, he was given a song called "Comandante Carlos Fonseca", written by composer Carlos Mejía Godoy and revolutionary Tomás Borge. After reforming Jefferson Starship in the 1990s, he added the song to his repertoire, eventually recording the song for the 2008 album Jefferson's Tree of Liberty.

Notes

References

Zimmermann, Matilde. Sandinista: Carlos Fonseca and the Nicaraguan Revolution. Duke University Press (2000).
Andrew, Christopher; Mitrokhin, Vasili. The World Was Going Our Way: The KGB and the Battle for the Third World. Basic Books (2005)
Borge, Tomás. The Patient Impatience Curbstone Press (1992).

External links
 Carlos Fonseca Biography

1936 births
1976 deaths
Members of the Sandinista National Liberation Front
Nicaraguan communists
Nicaraguan revolutionaries
Nicaraguan socialists
People from Matagalpa Department
People of the Nicaraguan Revolution
National Heroines and Heroes of Nicaragua